Miresa clarissa is a species of moth from the genus Miresa.   The species was first described by Caspar Stoll in 1790.

Range
When the species was initially described it was mentioned that the range is in Dutch Guiana (former name of Suriname) and Brazil.  Recent observation of the species suggests a range that extends beyond the Amazon basin extending up to Honduras.

References

Taxa named by Caspar Stoll
Fauna of Suriname
Fauna of Brazil
Insects described in 1790
Limacodidae